Raimundas Čivilis (24 November 1959 – 27 November 2000) was a Lithuanian basketball player, known for his career in Žalgiris Kaunas from 1977 to 1988.

Life 
Born in Panevėžys in 1959, Čivilis became a member of Žalgiris team in 1977. His early career, however, was not successful, until Vladas Garastas took the head coach's post in 1979. Garastas immediately took a liking in him and put him in the starting five. He naturally became a leader, and stayed one even after Arvydas Sabonis came to the team in 1981. In a match in 1986, when Žalgiris was playing against Petrović's Cibona Zagreb, and Sabonis fouled out, Čivilis took over and led his team to defeat Cibona 94:91.

In 1988, he left Žalgiris, played briefly for a Slovak basketball club, and retired soon afterwards. In 2000, Čivilis died of tuberculosis.

External links 
 Raimundas Čivilis

1959 births
2000 deaths
Lithuanian men's basketball players
Sportspeople from Panevėžys
20th-century deaths from tuberculosis
Place of death missing
BC Lietkabelis players
Tuberculosis deaths in Lithuania